An organotroph is an organism that obtains hydrogen or electrons from organic substrates. This term is used in microbiology to classify and describe organisms based on how they obtain electrons for their respiration processes.  Some organotrophs such as animals and many bacteria, are also heterotrophs. Organotrophs can be either anaerobic or aerobic.

Antonym: Lithotroph, Adjective: Organotrophic.

History
The term was suggested in 1946 by Lwoff and collaborators.

See also
 Autotroph
 Chemoorganotroph
 Primary nutritional groups

References

 Michael Allaby. "organotroph." A Dictionary of Zoology. 1999, Retrieved 2012-03-30 from Encyclopedia.com: http://www.encyclopedia.com/doc/1O8-organotroph.html
 The Prokaryotes - A Handbook on the Biology of Bacteria 3rd Ed., Vol 1, CHAPTER 1.4, Prokaryote Characterization and Identification 7, Retrieved from https://www.scribd.com/doc/9724380/1The-Prokaryotes-A-Handbook-on-the-Biology-of-Bacteria-3rd-Ed-Vol-1
 Respiration in aquatic ecosystems Paul A. Del Giorgio, Peter J. leB. Williams, Science, 2005, Retrieved 2012-04-24 from https://books.google.com/books?id=pD5RUDW1m7IC&lpg=PP1&pg=PP1#v=onepage&q&f=false

External links
 

Hydrogen biology
Molecular biology
Biochemistry